Iltija is a Pakistani television physiological drama series produced by Sana Shahnawaz and Samina Humayun Saeed under banner Next Level Entertainment. It is written by Saji Gul and directed by Mazhar Moin. Iltija focuses on the struggle of families who bring up the children with abnormalities such as Down Syndrome and Quadriplegia. It features a leading cast of Affan Waheed, Tooba Siddiqui, Rubina Ashraf, Imran Ashraf and child star Caitlyn Espinherio who is actually a Down Syndrome's victim.

Plot summary 

The story revolves around Hina and Sameer who love each other and marry. After their marriage, the test of their relationship starts when Hina births a girl with Down Syndrome. Due to the birth of a child who is not as normal as others, Sameer's mother does not like Hina and due to her interference she had to leave Sameer's house. Hina than starts living in her mother's house where she brings up her daughter Khushi, lone.

Cast 

 Tooba Siddiqui as Hina
 Affan Waheed as Sameer
 Caitlyn Espinherio as Khushi
 Rubina Ashraf as Sameer's mother
 Laila Wasti as Adeela
 Ali Tahir as Saqib
 Yashma Gill as Tayyaba
 Yasir Shah as Razi
 Imran Ashraf as Hadi
 Seemi Pasha as Hina's mother
 Mariam Mirza as doctor (special appearance)
 Akbar Subhani (special appearance)

Production 
In October 2016, it reported that Tooba Siddiqui will make her television comeback with Saji Gul's script about Down's Syndrome. She shared to DAWN Images that "My character's a woman who has a child suffering from Down's sundrome. Different events in her life have strained her relationship with her family and friends." Director Mazhar Moin said in an interview that many of the actors rejected the serial due to not being a mainstream media project.

Reception 

Along with a few television series of the series, DAWN Images said it as a serial of the year with different story from the others.

The series had mostly the ratings of 4–6TRPs.

References 

Pakistani television series